WMSX (96.1 FM) is a commercial radio station in Buffalo, New York, calling itself 96.1 The Breeze.  WMSX has an adult contemporary radio format, switching to Christmas music for much of November and December.  It is owned by Townsquare Media and has its radio studios in the Rand Building on Lafayette Square in downtown Buffalo.

WMSX has an effective radiated power (ERP) of 47,000 watts.  The station's transmitter is on the roof of the Rand Building.

History

WBNY-FM and WJYE
Its original call sign was WBNY-FM and was a sister station to WJJL 1440 AM in Niagara Falls. (The WBNY call letters had previously been used on WYSL, and the station is unrelated to today's WBNY, a college radio station at 91.3 FM). At the time, WJJL and WBNY were owned by the Niagara Frontier Broadcasting Corp.

In 1973, the station was acquired by McCormick Broadcasting. The station adopted the WJYE call letters on February 1, 1979, and was known as "JOY-FM-96." It spent many years as a beautiful music/easy listening station, playing quarter hour sweeps of soft, instrumental cover versions of popular songs.

Adult contemporary
In the 1990s, the easy listening format was aging, while most advertisers seek young to middle aged demographics.  That prompted WJYE to transition to soft adult contemporary music and eliminate nearly all instrumentals.  It also historically carried a Christmas music format from the middle of November to New Year's Day (typically changing formats within hours of rival WTSS).

In 1995, WJYE abandoned the "Joy 96" branding and began identifying by its call sign WJYE. It returned to the "Joy 96" branding in the late 2000s. In the late 1990s, WJYE was acquired by Infinity Broadcasting, which was later incorporated into CBS Radio.

In the summer of 2000, the syndicated call-in and request show Delilah was added for evenings.

Lance Diamond was the station's Saturday evening host for much of the 1990s and 2000s. The station began to stream over the Internet in November 2006. Also in 2006, WJYE, along with its Buffalo sister stations, were sold to Regent Broadcasting, which was later renamed Townsquare Media.

Starting in 2007, the station transitioned from its previous soft AC format to a more uptempo adult contemporary format.  The station added limited rhythmic songs to the playlist that would be appropriate for the format.

Switch to WMSX
On September 2, 2014, WJYE changed its call letters to WMSX, and changed its on-air branding to Mix 96. The format itself did not change from that of recent years, although it stopped playing Christmas music up until the 2018 winter season. The nationally syndicated Delilah, which aired on 96.1 for nearly two decades, moved to WECK in January 2016. Delilah's weeknight show returned to 96.1 in February 2019.

On December 25, 2018, after playing Christmas music since mid-November, WMSX rebranded as “96.1 The Breeze”. The format shifted to a softer-leaning AC, based on the success of the original “98.1 The Breeze” in San Francisco. WKQW-FM in Oil City, Pennsylvania picked up the Mix 96 brand and logo almost immediately after WMSX abandoned it; in 2022, it moved exclusively online under the ownership of WXMT. Townsquare described the sound as "modified soft rock," returning to the format the station held before 2007.  It also brought back Joe Chille, the station's previous morning host from that era, after he was at WECK for a short time. Chille left the station again to rejoin WECK in October 2021.

Previous logo

References

External links

MSX
Townsquare Media radio stations
Mainstream adult contemporary radio stations in the United States
Radio stations established in 1966
1966 establishments in New York (state)